Charles Ezra may refer to:

 Charles Ezra Beury (1926–1941), second president of Temple University
 Charles Ezra Daniel (1895–1964), United States Army officer
 Charles Ezra Greene (1842–1903), American civil engineer

See also

 Ezra Charles, stage name of Charles Helpinstill, founder of the company of the same name which makes portable amplified pianos for stage performance